Crossidius hurdi is a species of beetle in the family Cerambycidae. It was described by Chemsak & Linsley in 1959.

References

Trachyderini
Beetles described in 1959